Claude Judson "Chaucer" Elliott (November 17, 1876 – June 22, 1923) was a professional baseball player.  He was a right-handed pitcher over parts of two seasons (1904–1905) with the Cincinnati Reds and New York Giants.  For his career, he compiled a 3–3 record in 22 appearances, with a 3.33 earned run average and 47 strikeouts.  He was a member of the 1905 World Series champions Giants, though he did not play in the World Series.

In 1905, Elliott relieved 8 times in his 10 appearances. Though saves were not an official statistic until 1969, Elliot was retroactively credited with six saves that season, a record at that time. His manager, John McGraw, was one of the first to use a relief pitcher to save games.

On June 29, 1905, while playing for the Giants, Elliott played a part in history that would be immortalized some 80 years later with the making of Field of Dreams.  The movie included a depiction of Moonlight Graham, who only played one inning in Major League baseball and never got an at-bat. It was Elliot who flied out ending the top of the ninth inning with Graham on deck.

Elliott was born in Pardeeville, Wisconsin. He died of muscular atrophy in Pardeeville at the age of 46.

See also
 List of Major League Baseball annual saves leaders

References

External links

1876 births
1923 deaths
Major League Baseball pitchers
Baseball players from Wisconsin
Cincinnati Reds players
New York Giants (NL) players
People from Pardeeville, Wisconsin
Milwaukee Brewers (minor league) players
Jackson (minor league baseball) players
Detroit Tigers (Western League) players
Rockford Rough Riders players
Louisville Colonels (minor league) players
Providence Grays (minor league) players
Indianapolis Indians players